The Skirmish at Adamstown was a Battle that was fought between the Union army and the Confederate army in Frederick County, Maryland, on October 14, 1864. The result of the Battle is inconclusive.

External links

Adamstown
Adamstown
Conflicts in 1864
1864 in Maryland
October 1864 events
Frederick County, Maryland